Luis Gabriel Garcia Uribe (born 5 June 1988) commonly known as Luis Garcia is a Peruvian football midfielder playing for Universidad Técnica de Cajamarca.

Club career
He has played for San Martin and León de Huánuco in the home league. In 2011-12 he played abroad in Bolivia in Blooming. In 2012, he returned to Peru to play for Unión Comercio.

International career
On 27 March 2013 he made his debut for the national team against Trinidad and Tobago. In 46th minute he was replaced by Daniel Chavez

References

1988 births
Living people
Association football midfielders
Peruvian footballers
Peru international footballers
Peruvian expatriate footballers
FBC Melgar footballers
Club Deportivo Universidad de San Martín de Porres players
León de Huánuco footballers
Club Blooming players
Unión Comercio footballers
Club Universitario de Deportes footballers
Deportivo Municipal footballers
Real Garcilaso footballers
Sport Huancayo footballers
Cienciano footballers
Carlos A. Mannucci players
Universidad Técnica de Cajamarca footballers
Peruvian expatriate sportspeople in Bolivia
Expatriate footballers in Bolivia